Igo is an unincorporated community 9 miles west of Redding, CA. Its population is 103 as of the 2020 census. Its ZIP Code is 96047. Wired Telephone numbers follow the pattern 530-396-xxxx. It has a neighboring town of Ono, which is four miles west of Igo. It is also home to the Northern California Veterans Cemetery, dedicated in December 2005. It has a post office, elementary school, general store, and a restaurant/beer & wine bar/banquet hall - The Igo Inn. It is also home to Brigadoon Castle Bed and Breakfast, but it is now a private residence.

The name Igo may be derived from an unidentified Native American language. According to folk etymology, Igo was named from the question "I go?" frequently asked by a miner's son who liked to accompany his father to work.

Politics
In the state legislature Igo is in the 1st Senate District, represented by Republican Ted Gaines, and in the 1st Assembly District, represented by Republican Brian Dahle.

Igo, California, and its neighboring community Ono, share a community newsletter, the Umbrella available online at http://www.igoono.com/

Climate
According to the Köppen Climate Classification system, Igo has a warm-summer Mediterranean climate, abbreviated "Csa" on climate maps.

References

Unincorporated communities in California
Unincorporated communities in Shasta County, California